Beanley Island is part of the Great Barrier Reef Marine Park in the Howick Group National Park and is about 100 km south-east of Cape Melville in the Australian state of Queensland.
 It is around 7 hectares or 0.07 square km in size.
This island is north-west of Howick Island.

References 

Islands on the Great Barrier Reef
Places in the Great Barrier Reef Marine Park
Uninhabited islands of Australia
Islands of Far North Queensland